Antônio José Imbassahy da Silva, or simply Antônio Imbassahy, (born 12 March 1948) is a Brazilian politician and electrical engineer, former governor of Bahia and former mayor of Salvador.

Elected federal deputy by the Brazilian Social Democracy Party (PSDB), da Silva was chosen leader of the party in the Chamber of Deputies in December 2015 and took office on 2 February 2016. Also, in December of the same year, Imbassahy was chosen to be Secretary of Government, replacing Geddel Vieira Lima. Resigned in 8 December 2017, one day before the national convention of the PSDB, which officialized its departure from the government.

See also
 List of mayors of Salvador, Bahia

References

1948 births
Living people
Government ministers of Brazil
Brazilian Social Democracy Party politicians
Liberal Front Party (Brazil) politicians
Mayors of places in Brazil
People from Salvador, Bahia
Members of the Chamber of Deputies (Brazil) from Bahia
Members of the Legislative Assembly of Bahia
Governors of Bahia